Thimbron or Thibron  may refer to:

 Thimbron (fl. 400–391 BC), Lacedaemonian general in the Corinthian War
 Thimbron (fl. 324–322 BC), Lacedaemonian officer of Harpalus and leader of campaigns in Cyrenaica